Branislav Lončar (Serbian Cyrillic: Бранислав Лончар; 19 November 1938 – September 2019) was a Serbian sport shooter who competed for Yugoslavia at the 1960 and 1968 Summer Olympics.

References

External links
ISSF profile

1938 births
2019 deaths
Serbian male sport shooters
Yugoslav male sport shooters
Shooters at the 1960 Summer Olympics
Shooters at the 1968 Summer Olympics
Olympic shooters of Yugoslavia
People from Bačka Palanka